Titaea tamerlan is a moth of the family Saturniidae found in Central and South America.

In Costa Rica, adults are on wing from June to July and again in fall. 

The larvae feed on Bombax species, Bombacopsis quinatum and Tilia platyphyllos, and possibly kopak trees.

Subspecies
Titaea tamerlan tamerlan (Brazil)
Titaea tamerlan amazonensis Lemaire, 1980 (Colombia, Venezuela, Guyana, Surinam, French Guiana, Ecuador, Peru, Brazil)
Titaea tamerlan guayaquila (Schaus, 1932) (Ecuador, Peru)
Titaea tamerlan nobilis (Schaus, 1912) (Mexico, Belize, Costa Rica, Panama, Colombia, Ecuador, Peru, Venezuela)

References

Arsenurinae
Moths described in 1869